The Billboard Tropical Airplay chart ranks the best-performing tropical songs of the United States. Published by Billboard magazine, the data are compiled by Nielsen Broadcast Data Systems based collectively on each single's weekly airplay.

Chart history

References

United States Tropical Songs
2014
2014 in Latin music